Tamwe Township (also Tarmwe Township;) is located in east central Yangon, Myanmar. The township comprises 20 wards, and shares borders with Yankin Township in the north, Thingangyun Township and Mingala Taungnyunt Township in the east, Bahan Township in the west, and Mingala Taungnyunt township in the south.

Etymology
"Tamwe" derives from the Mon language term "Tamoa", which means "one toddy palm tree."

Education
The township has 30 primary schools, four middle schools and six high schools.

Population 
As of 2014 March, Tamwe has a population of 165,313 with 45.2% male residents and 54.8% female residents.

Landmarks

The following is a list of landmarks protected by the city in Tamwe township.

References

Townships of Yangon